Beverley S. Davis (born c. 1957) is an American former professional golfer who is currently an instructor with LPGA International.

Amateur career 
Davis ranked sixth among the top ten female amateur golfers in America after winning the Trans-National Championship in 1975.  She accepted an athletic scholarship to attend the University of Florida in Gainesville, Florida, where she played for coach Mimi Ryan's Florida Gators women's golf team in Association for Intercollegiate Athletics for Women (AIAW) competition from 1976 to 1979.  As a freshman in 1976, Davis was the runner-up in the AIAW championship behind Nancy Lopez.  As a junior, she was a member of the Gators women's team that was the runner-up at the 1978 AIAW championship.  During her years as a Gator golfer, Davis was a three-time individual medalist, and was recognized as a first-team All-American in 1976 and 1979.

Professional career 
Davis and joined the LPGA Tour in 1980 and competed until 1986.  During her six-year stint, she recorded a career-best finish in a tie for fifth at the Mary Kay Classic in 1982 and also took tenth in the 1982 U.S. Women's Open, and Davis shot a personal low of 66.  She was runner-up in the LPGA Qualifying School in 1980 and 1986.

Davis' recent accomplishments include a fourteenth-place finish in the 2004 LPGA T&CP National Championship, winning the 2005 LPGA Teaching and Club Professional (T&CP) Southeast Section Team Championship, and a third-place finish in the 2006 LPGA T&CP Northeast Sectional Championship.

See also 

List of Florida Gators women's golfers on the LPGA Tour
List of University of Florida alumni

External links 
University of Florida Golfers Honor Roll
Florida Lady Gators

American female golfers
Florida Gators women's golfers
LPGA Tour golfers
Golfers from Florida
People from Alachua County, Florida
1957 births
Living people